Tina Live is a live album and video album by Tina Turner, released on September 28, 2009, in Europe by Parlophone and on October 13, 2009, in the United States by Manhattan Records. The tracks were recorded at the GelreDome in Arnhem, Netherlands, on March 21, 2009, during Turner's 50th Anniversary Tour.

Track listing

Charts

Weekly charts

Year-end charts

References

2009 live albums
2009 video albums
Live video albums
Manhattan Records albums
Parlophone live albums
Parlophone video albums
Tina Turner live albums
Tina Turner video albums